Namrata is an Indian or Nepalese feminine given name that may refer to
Namrata Brar, Indian-American journalist, investigative reporter and news anchor
Namrata Mohanty, Indian Odia singer
Namrata Purohit (born 1993), Indian Pilates instructor
Namrata Rao (born 1981), Indian film editor
Namrata Sawhney (born 1970), Indian actress, voice actress and singer
Namrata Shrestha, Nepalese model and actress
Namrata Shirodkar (born 1972), Indian actress, producer and former model
Namrata Singh Gujral (born 1976), Indian-American director, producer and actor
Namrata Thapa, Indian film and television actress

Indian feminine given names
Nepalese feminine given names